Chhalawa is Pakistani romantic comedy film, written, directed and produced by Wajahat Rauf under his Showcase Films. Edited by Hasan Ali Khan. It has Mehwish Hayat, Azfar Rehman, Zara Noor Abbas, Asad Siddiqui, Aashir Wajahat and Mehmood Aslam in pivot roles. It released on Eid al-Fitr, June 2019, by Hum Films and Eveready Pictures.

Cast 
 Mehwish Hayat as Zoya
 Azfar Rehman as Samee
 Zara Noor Abbas as Haya
 Asad Siddiqui as Luqman
 Aashir Wajahat as Haroon
 Adnan Shah Tipu as Chaudhry Nazakut
 Mohsin Ejaz as Jalal Chaudhry
 Mehmood Aslam as Chaudhry Rafaqat; Zoya, Haya and Haroon's father
 Sarwan Ali Palijo as Sameer Friend

Release
The teaser of the film was released on 28 March, while trailer was released on 24 April. The film was released on Eid al-Fitr.

Home media
Chhalawa had its World TV Premiere on Eid-ul-Adha, in August 2019 which was held by Hum TV.

Digital release
Chhalawa was made available on Amazone Prime Video for online streaming.

Reception

Box office 
It earned  in its first three days of release. Chhalawa's  total box office collected PKR 180 million

Critical reception 
Hassan Hassan of Galaxy Lollywood rated the film 1.5 out of 5 stars saying that Chhalawa will not utterly disappoint you if you leave your brain outside the cinema.

Soundtrack

References

External links 
 
 

Hum films
2019 films
2019 romantic comedy films
Pakistani romantic comedy films
Films scored by Shiraz Uppal
2010s Urdu-language films